Claudia Razzeto (born 18 April 1991) is a Peruvian former tennis player.

In her career, Razzeto won one singles title and three doubles titles on the ITF Circuit. On 27 October 2008, she achieved her career-high WTA singles ranking of 560. Her career-high in doubles is world No. 527, reached on 27 October 2008. She decided to follow the college route and was part of the Loyola Marymount Lions tennis team from 2010 to 2013.

Playing for Peru Fed Cup team, Razzeto has a win–loss record of 2–2.

ITF finals

Singles: 1 (1 title)

Doubles: 7 (3 titles, 4 runner–ups)

References

External links
 
 

1991 births
Living people
Peruvian female tennis players
Sportspeople from Lima
Loyola Marymount Lions athletes
Peruvian expatriate sportspeople in the United States
College women's tennis players in the United States
21st-century Peruvian women